Compsoctena pinguis is a moth in the family Eriocottidae. It was described by Edward Meyrick in 1914. It is found in Taiwan and China.

Subspecies
Compsoctena pinguis pinguis
Compsoctena pinguis insularis Dierl, 1970 (China: Hainan)
Compsoctena pinguis scoriopis (Meyrick, 1934) (China: Hebei)

References

Moths described in 1914
Compsoctena
Moths of Asia
Moths of Taiwan